Reginald Browne may refer to:

 Reginald Spencer Browne (1856–1943), Australian WWI Brigadier General, journalist and newspaper editor
 Edwy Searles Brooks (1889–1965), British novelist who used a number of pseudonyms, including Reginald Browne

See also
 Reggie Brown (disambiguation)